The Samuel T. Merritt House is located in Hudson, Wisconsin, United States. It was added to the National Register of Historic Places in 1984.

It is a two-story Italianate house upon a stone foundation which was bought by Samuel T. Merritt in 1862.  Merritt was a teacher, who moved from New York State to here.

Merritt became wealthy through business ventures including by being "the first to ship wheat down the (St. Croix) river to La Crosse, ...by barge, with a boat 'Viola', which was built in Hudson".   Merritt was "A devout Baptist and Republican, ....recognized as a highly prominent and influential citizen, revered as 'starting out in life poor in pocket, but rich in the possession of health, courage, and ability. His success has not come...by any royal road, but through careful plodding work, good investments, and excellent management, while the ...esteem in which he has held has been honestly won by honorable methods and a pleasing personality.'"

After he purchased the house in 1862, he lived in it from 1867 to his death in 1918.

References

Houses completed in 1862
Houses in St. Croix County, Wisconsin
Houses on the National Register of Historic Places in Wisconsin
Italianate architecture in Wisconsin
National Register of Historic Places in St. Croix County, Wisconsin